NDSI may refer to:

Novell Data Systems, Inc.
Nintendo DSi, a 2008 handheld video game console
Nintendo DSi XL, a larger version of the DSi, released in 2009

See also
NDS (disambiguation)